The Theorem Proving System (TPS)  is an automated theorem proving system for first-order and higher-order logic. TPS has been developed at Carnegie Mellon University. An educational version of it is known as ETPS (Educational  Theorem Proving System).

External links
 Theorem Proving System web page

Theorem proving software systems
Common Lisp (programming language) software